Pedro Escobedo is the seat of Pedro Escobedo Municipality of the State of Querétaro, part of the industrial corridor.

Populated places in Querétaro